Events from the year 1922 in Taiwan, Empire of Japan.

Incumbents

Central government of Japan
 Prime Minister: Takahashi Korekiyo, Katō Tomosaburō

Taiwan
 Governor-General – Den Kenjirō

Events

April
 1 April – The opening of Shinchiku Prefectural Shinchiku High School in Shinchiku Prefecture.

September
 13 September – The opening of Mudan Station in Taihoku Prefecture.

October
 11 October – The opening of Baishatun Station in Shinchiku Prefecture.

Births
 16 February – Wang Ching-rui, shooter

References

 
Years of the 20th century in Taiwan